Bad Boys Inc were a British boy band, formed in 1993 by the record producer Ian Levine. Signed to A&M Records, the members were David W. Ross (born 15 March 1974 in Bournemouth), Matthew Pateman (born 14 May 1971 in Sidcup, Kent), Tony Dowding (born 6 September 1972 in Welwyn Garden City) and Ally Begg (born 21 August 1973 in Bury St Edmunds).

Career
As for many manufactured boy bands in the 1990s, Bad Boys inc career ended as quickly as it started, but the band initially had some success following their first UK hit single, "Don't Talk About Love", the band enjoyed minor international success with tours and promotion in Europe and Japan. After their Top 20 album Bad Boys Inc, and three Top 20 singles including the Top 10 hit "More to This World", the band went on to win international acclaim by being awarded Best International Newcomer in both Denmark and Finland in 1994. They were also the first band to appear on the UK National Lottery television programme before going their separate ways in the spring of 1995.

Discography

Albums

Singles

References

 

Musical groups established in 1992
Musical groups disestablished in 1995
English boy bands
Musical groups from London